The Bombay explosion (or Bombay docks explosion) occurred on 14 April 1944, in the Victoria Dock of Bombay, British India (now Mumbai, India) when the British freighter SS Fort Stikine, carrying a mixed cargo of cotton bales, timber, oil, gold, and ammunition including around 1,400 tons of explosives with an additional 240 tons of torpedoes and weapons, caught fire and was destroyed in two giant blasts, scattering debris, sinking surrounding ships and setting fire to the area, killing around 800 to 1,300 people. Some 80,000 people were made homeless and 71 firemen lost their lives in the aftermath.

Vessel, the voyage and cargo

The  was a 7,142 gross register ton freighter built in 1942 in Prince Rupert, British Columbia, under a lend-lease agreement, and was named after Fort Stikine, a former outpost of the Hudson's Bay Company located at what is now Wrangell, Alaska.

Sailing from Birkenhead on 24 February, via Gibraltar, Port Said and Karachi, she arrived at Bombay on 12 April 1944.  Her cargo included 1,395 tons of explosives including 238 tons of sensitive "A" explosives, torpedoes, mines, shells, and munitions.  She also carried Supermarine Spitfire fighter aircraft, raw cotton bales, barrels of oil, timber, scrap iron and approximately £890,000 of gold bullion in bars in 31 crates.  The 87,000 bales of cotton and lubricating oil were loaded at Karachi and the ship's captain, Alexander James Naismith, recorded his protest about such a "mixture" of cargo.  The transportation of cotton through the sea route was inevitable for the merchants, as transporting cotton by rail from Punjab and Sindh to Bombay was banned at that time.  Naismith, who lost his life in the explosion, described the cargo as "just about everything that will either burn or blow up."

Incident

In the mid-afternoon around 14:00, the crew were alerted to a fire onboard burning somewhere in the No. 2 hold.  The crew, dockside fire teams and fireboats were unable to extinguish the conflagration, despite pumping over 900 tons of water into the ship, nor were they able to find the source due to the dense smoke.  The water was boiling all over the ship, due to heat generated by the fire.

This and a later second explosion were powerful enough to be recorded by seismographs at the Colaba Observatory in the city. Sensors recorded that the earth trembled at Shimla, a city over 1,700 km away. The shower of burning material set fire to slums in the area. Around  were set ablaze in an  arc around the ship. Eleven neighbouring vessels had been sunk or were sinking, and the emergency personnel at the site suffered heavy losses. Attempts to fight the fire were dealt a further blow when the second explosion from the ship swept the area at 16:34. Burning cotton bales fell from the sky on docked ships, the dock yard, and slum areas outside the harbour. Some of the most developed and economically important parts of Bombay were wiped out by the blast and resulting fire.

News
The details of the explosions and losses were first reported to the outside world by Radio Saigon, a Japanese-controlled radio which gave a detailed report of the incident on 15 April 1944.  British-Indian wartime censorship permitted news reporters to send the reports only in the second week of May 1944. Time Magazine published the story as late as 22 May 1944 and still it was news to the outside world.  A movie depicting the explosions and aftermath, made by Indian cinematographer Sudhish Ghatak, was confiscated by military officers although parts of it were shown to the public as a newsreel at a later date.

Loss

The total number of lives lost in the explosion is estimated at more than 800, some estimates put the figure around 1,300.  More than 500 civilians lost their lives, many of them residing in adjoining slum areas, but as it was wartime, information about the full extent of the damage was partially censored. The results of the explosion are summarised as follows:
 Two hundred thirty-one people killed were attached to various dock services including fire brigade and dock employees.
 Of the above figure, 66 were firemen
 More than 500 civilians were killed
 Some estimates put total deaths up to 1,300
 More than 2,500 were injured, including civilians
 Thirteen ships were lost and some other ships heavily or partially damaged
 Out of above, three Royal Indian Navy ships lost
 Thirty-one wooden crates, each containing four gold bars, each gold bar weighing 800 Troy ounces or almost 25 kg. (almost all since recovered)
 More than 50,000 tonnes of shipping destroyed and another 50,000 tonnes of shipping damaged
 Loss of more than 50,000 tonnes of food grains, including rice, which gave rise to black marketing of food grains afterwards.

Suburban relief activities
According to Mr.D.N. Wandrekar, a senior journalist in The Bombay Chronicle newspaper dated 20 April 1944 stated that Mumbaikars are always known for their good heart which is why around five days after the incident massive relief activities were shifted to the suburbs owing to the neutralization of South Mumbai from the damages caused. Soon after the calamity people from the affected areas began pouring into the suburbs. About six thousand persons from the Mandvi area mostly middle class went to Ghatkopar. The workers and others from Ghatkopar got the three schools opened for their accommodation and private households also provided accommodation to these unfortunate families.

There was a rush of laborers from the dock areas who wanted to get out of Bombay on foot by the Agra Road. Ghatkopar workers opened a kitchen for them at the Hindu Sabha Hall. The kitchen served food for about a thousand persons twice daily. The Ghatkopar kitchen was still running when Vile Parle's Irla residents started running a second center for about 500 persons, where food and lodging were provided for the refugees. A third kitchen was opened at Khotwadi and Narli Agripada in Santacruz where about 300 people were being served. In Khar, arrangements had been made to give rations to about a hundred persons who have found accommodation in Kherwadiand Old Khar village. Khar Danda a fishermen's village had made arrangements for about a hundred people's accommodation and food. Many families on the Salsette Island, also known as Mumbai Suburb opened doors to the needy. The rich have come forward with big donations and youths, male and female organized into Volunteer Corps have been doing all the labor for these different centers.

Salvage
As part of the salvage operation, sub-lieutenant Ken Jackson, RNVR was seconded to the Indian government to establish the pumping operation.  He and chief petty officer Charles Brazier arrived in Bombay on 7 May 1944.  Over a period of three months, many ships were salvaged.  The de-watering operation took three months to complete, after which Jackson and Brazier returned to their base in Colombo. Jackson remained in the Far East for another two years, conducting further salvage work.  For their efforts with the pumping operation, both men were rewarded: Brazier was awarded the MBE, and Jackson received an accelerated promotion.  An Australian minesweeper, HMAS Gawler, landed working parties on 21 June 1944, to assist in the restoration of the port.

Aftermath
It took three days to bring the fire under control, and later, 8,000 men toiled for seven months to remove around 500,000 tons of debris and bring the docks back into action.

The inquiry into the explosion identified the cotton bales as probably being the seat of the fire.  It was critical of several errors:
 storing the cotton below the munitions,
 not displaying the red flag (B flag) required to indicate a "dangerous cargo on board",
 delaying unloading the explosives,
 not using steam injectors to contain the fire, and
 a delay in alerting the local fire brigade.

Many families lost all their belongings and were left with just the clothes on their backs. Thousands became destitute. It was estimated that about 6,000 firms were affected and 50,000 lost their jobs.  The government took full responsibility for the disaster and monetary compensation was paid to citizens who made a claim for loss or damage to property.

During periodical dredging operations to maintain the depth of the docking bays, many intact gold bars have been found, some as late as February 2011, and returned to the government.  A live shell weighing 45 kg (100 lb) was also found in October 2011.  The Mumbai Fire Brigade's headquarters at Byculla has a memorial to the fire fighters who died.  National Fire Safety Week is observed across India from 14 to 21 April, in memory of the 66 firemen who died in this explosion.

Ships lost or severely damaged
Apart from Fort Stikine, the following vessels were sunk or severely damaged.

See also
 List of accidents and incidents involving transport or storage of ammunition
 List of the largest artificial non-nuclear explosions
 Halifax Explosion

References

Notes

Bibliography

External links

 The First and Last Voyage of the Fort Crevier
 The day it rained gold

Explosions in 1944
Explosions in India
Ship fires
Non-combat military accidents
1944 in British India
1944 in India
History of Mumbai
20th century in Mumbai
Disasters in Maharashtra
Maritime incidents in April 1944
British Empire in World War II
April 1944 events
1944 disasters in India